Jack Denis Laird  (29 August 1920 – 7 August 2009) was a New Zealand potter.

Early life
Laird was born in Watford, Hertfordshire, England, on 29 August 1920. He married Peggy Marjorie Biggerstaff in 1943. Following World War II, he studied illustration and graphic design at the Chelsea School of Art on an ex-serviceman's scholarship, and began to specialize in pottery while undertaking postgraduate study at the University of London. In 1953, Laird moved to Jersey where he taught art at a grammar school.  In 1959, he emigrated to New Zealand to teach extramurally, based in Palmerston North, at Victoria University of Wellington. He became a naturalised New Zealand citizen in 1975.

Pottery in Nelson
In 1964, the Lairds established Waimea Pottery in Richmond, New Zealand, near Nelson. There, Laird trained a generation of Nelson potters, including Royce McGlashen, Darryl Robertson, John and Anne Crawford, and Laird's son Paul. At its peak Waimea Pottery employed 17 potters. Later, Laird designed tableware for Temuka Pottery.

In the 1984 New Year Honours, Laird was appointed an Officer of the Order of the British Empire, for services to pottery.

Laird died in 2009.

References

1920 births
2009 deaths
People from Watford
Alumni of Chelsea College of Arts
Alumni of the University of London
British emigrants to New Zealand
People from Richmond, New Zealand
New Zealand potters
New Zealand Officers of the Order of the British Empire
20th-century ceramists
Naturalised citizens of New Zealand